Chad Davis (born 1 June 1980) is a former Australian rules footballer who played with St Kilda in the Australian Football League (AFL) between 2000 and 2002.

Chad Davis gained notoriety in the 2002 season while playing for St Kilda's Victorian Football League (VFL) affiliate Springvale when he was bitten on the scrotum by Port Melbourne's Peter Filandia. Filandia was subsequently suspended for 10 matches and ordered to undergo counselling before resuming playing.

References

External links

Living people
1980 births
Australian rules footballers from Victoria (Australia)
St Kilda Football Club players
People educated at Carey Baptist Grammar School